The 2020 Men's European Water Polo Championship was the 34th edition of the major European water polo tournament for national teams. It was held at the Danube Arena in Budapest, Hungary, from 14 to 26 January 2020.

Hungary claimed their 13th title by defeating Spain in the final.

Host
LEN announced the choice of Budapest as host for the competition on 9 July 2016. All the matches were played at the Danube Arena.

Qualification

Sixteen teams were allowed to the tournament. The qualification was as follows:
 The host nation
 The best seven teams from the 2018 European Championships not already qualified as the host nation
 Eight teams from the qualifiers

Format
The sixteen teams were split in four groups with four teams each. The first classified team of each group directly qualified for the quarterfinals, the second and third teams played each other in cross group format to qualify for the quarterfinals.

Squads

Draw
The draw of the preliminary round's pools was held in Budapest on 22 October 2019. The teams were divided into four groups of four teams each; according to LEN rules the first batch for the draw was composed by the best four teams of the previous edition, the second batch by the teams ranked from fifth to eighth in 2018, while the third and fourth batch were composed respectively by the teams ranked first and second in the four qualification groups.

The draw resulted in the following groups:

Preliminary round
All times are local (UTC+1).

Group A

Group B

Group C

Group D

Knockout stage

Bracket

5th place bracket

9th place bracket

13th place bracket

Play-offs

Quarterfinals

13–16th place semifinals

9–12th place semifinals

5–8th place semifinals

Semifinals

15th place game

13th place game

Eleventh place game

Ninth place game

Seventh place game

Fifth place game

Third place game

Final

Final standing

1 Serbia qualified for the 2020 Summer Olympics as the winner of 2019 World League
2 Italy qualified for the 2020 Summer Olympics as the winner of 2019 World Championships
3 Spain qualified for the 2020 Summer Olympics as the runners-up of 2019 World Championships
4 The Netherlands qualified for the 2020 Summer Olympics World qualification tournament as the host of the tournament

Statistics and awards

Top goalscorers

Source: wp2020budapest.microplustiming.com

Top goalkeepers

Source: wp2020budapest.microplustiming.com

Awards
The awards were announced on 26 January 2020.

References

External links
Official website

Men
Men's European Water Polo Championship
International water polo competitions hosted by Hungary
Men's European Water Polo Championship
European Water Polo Championship
European Water Polo Championship